Patricia Ann "Patsy" Lovell (born 3 May 1954) is an English former cricketer who played as an all-rounder. She was a right-arm off break bowler and right-handed batter. She appeared in 10 One Day Internationals (ODIs) for England, making her debut against Australia in July 1987. She played in all nine of England's matches in the 1988 Women's Cricket World Cup, including the final loss to Australia. Overall, she took eight wickets with a best of three for 15 and scored 41 runs in ODI cricket. Her final WODI appearance was in the final of the 1988 Women's Cricket World Cup. She played domestic cricket for Surrey.

References

External links
 
 

1954 births
Living people
People from Croydon
England women One Day International cricketers
Surrey women cricketers